The Ramchaura Mandir is a Hindu Temple in the city of Hajipur, Bihar, India. Dedicated to Lord Rama, it is located at Rambhadra near Helabazar, Hajipur. As per local folklore, it is said to have been in existence since Ramayana period and Lord Shri Ram is believed to have visited this place on his way to Janakpur, where his footprints are worshiped. The Ramchaura Mandir has tradition of celebrating Rama Navami, the birth anniversary of Rama,  every year. A small fair is also organised on the eve of Rama Navami.

Archeological objects excavated from Ramchaura are kept at the Patna Museum

Etymology
Chaura is a Bhojpuri language word which means orchid.

Deity
The presiding deity of the temple is 'Lord Rama'. Rama Navami is celebrated with full zeal and enthusiasm. It is a Hindu festival, celebrating the birth of Lord Rama to King Dasharatha and Queen Kausalya of Ayodhya. Ram is the 7th incarnation of the Dashavatara of Vishnu. The SreeRama Navami festival falls in the Shukla Paksha on the Navami, the ninth day of the month of Chaitra in the Hindu calendar. Thus it is also known as Chaitra Masa Suklapaksha Navami, and marks the end of the nine-day Chaitra-Navratri celebrations.

Significance of a Ramchaura Mandir
Lord Shri Ram Chandra, the legendary king of Ayodhya during his learning period had arrived here and had got his Mundan (first head shaving ceremony) done. The temple hence was made on his footprints and this place has great religious value for the Hindu populace. This footprint is at the altitude of 45 m from ground. Bael (Aegle marmelos) is taken as prashad on the eve of Rama Navami. "Bari Sangat" and "Chhoti Sangat" is also situated near this pious place. During ancient period many Saints, Mahatmas and Yogi used to visit these "Sangats" and offered prayer. A popular fair is also organised here on the occasion of Rama Navami every year.

The important celebrations on this day take place at Ayodhya (Uttar Pradesh), Bhadrachalam (Andhra Pradesh), Vayoor and Ramapada Temple, Rameswaram (Tamil Nadu), thronged by thousands of devotees. Rathayatras, the chariot processions, also known as Shobha yatras of Rama, Sita, Lakshmana and Hanuman, are taken out at several places.

Visiting the Temple 
There are various ways to reach the temple, most visitors approach the temple as they reach mahabir chowk. Rambhadra near Helabazar, Hajipur is located near the temple.

Gallery (Ramchaura Mandir - Hajipur)

See also
List of Hindu temples in India
Hajipur

References

External links
Where is a Ramchaura Mandir?

Hindu temples in Bihar
Rama temples
Hajipur